Captain Joseph Guild represented Dedham, Massachusetts in the Great and General Court. He was also town clerk for a total of four years, having first been elected in 1773. Additionally, he served seven terms as selectman, with his first election in 1768.

On the morning of April 19, 1775, a messenger came "down the Needham road" with news about the battle in Lexington.  Guild 'gagged a croaker' who said the news was false and in an hour" the "men of Dedham, even the old men, received their minister's blessing and went forth, in such numbers that scarce one male between sixteen and seventy was left at home."  Aaron Guild, a captain in the British Army during the French and Indian War, was plowing his fields in South Dedham (today Norwood) when he heard of the battle.  He immediately "left plough in furrow [and] oxen standing" to set forth for the conflict, arriving in time to fire upon the retreating British.

References

Works cited

Members of the Massachusetts General Court
Year of birth missing
Year of death missing
Dedham, Massachusetts selectmen
Dedham Town Clerks